Rhyzodiastes liratus is a species of ground beetle in the subfamily Rhysodinae. It was described by Edward Newman in 1838. The lectotype was collected by Charles Darwin. It is endemic to the southeastern Brazil, between the stated of Bahia and São Paulo. Rhyzodiastes liratus measure  in length.

References

Rhyzodiastes
Beetles of South America
Insects of Brazil
Endemic fauna of Brazil
Beetles described in 1838
Taxa named by Edward Newman